The Kampala–Hoima Road is a road in the Central and Western regions of Uganda, connecting the cities of Kampala and Hoima. A section of this road, between Namungoona and Busunju, is being developed into the Kampala–Busunju Expressway.

Location

Overview
The highway is an all-weather tarmac single carriageway road. It offers the most direct route from Kampala to the oil-rich Albertine region in the Western Region.

Upgrade to tarmac
Before 2006, the road was gravel surfaced. The government of Uganda contracted for the road to be upgraded to class II bitumen surface with shoulders, drainage channels, and culverts. The upgrade lasted until 2009.

See also
 List of roads in Uganda

References

External links
Government Teams-up With World Bank To Build Over $1.5b Road Projects
UNRA paves 1200km roads; 5,000km for tarmacking by 2016

Roads in Uganda
Wakiso District
Mityana District
Kiboga District
Kyankwanzi District
Hoima District
Transport in Kampala